USS Gulfport (AK-5) was a cargo ship acquired by the U.S. Navy for service in World War I.

Acquiring a captured German freighter 
Gulfport, formerly SS Locksun, ex-SS Andree Rickmers, was built at Bremerhaven, Germany, in 1902 by Rickmers Aktien Gesellschaft and was owned by the German Norddeutscher Lloyd Steamship Lines Co. In Pearl Harbor when the United States entered World War I, she was seized by Government orders and converted to a cargo transport at the Honolulu Navy Yard. She commissioned 1 September 1917 at Honolulu.

World War I North Atlantic operations 
In company with four submarines, Gulfport sailed from Hawaii on 30 October 1917, reaching New York 28 January 1918 via San Diego, California, Corinto, Nicaragua, Balboa, Key West, Florida, and Norfolk, Virginia. At New York she discharged her cargo, primarily pineapple, and was attached to the Naval Overseas Transportation Service.

Post-war operations 
Until she decommissioned in 1922, Gulfport served as a cargo ship linking New York and Charleston with various Caribbean ports, particularly Guantanamo, Cuba; St. Thomas, Virgin Islands; Port-au-Prince, Haiti; and Santo Domingo, Dominican Republic. During this period she made a total of 23 round trips to the West Indies, carrying oil and other necessary supplies to American troops based there and frequently returning with a cargo of sugar from the islands. Gulfport was detached from NOTS on 10 October 1919 and placed under the military jurisdiction of the Commandant, 6th Naval District, Charleston, for duty in the West Indies Freight Service.

Last voyage and decommissioning 
Gulfport completed her last voyage to the Caribbean on 25 November 1921 as she returned to New York; there she decommissioned 3 March 1922 at the Brooklyn Navy Yard and was sold to Moore & McCormack Inc. of New York on 25 July 1922.

Military awards and honors 
Her crew was authorized the following medals:
 World War I Victory Medal (with Transport clasp)
 Haitian Campaign Medal

References

External links 
 NavSource Online: Service Ship Photo Archive - SP 2989 / AK-5 Gulfport

Ships built in Bremen (state)
1902 ships
Cargo ships of the United States Navy
World War I cargo ships of the United States